"Casual Sex" is a song by Canadian rock band My Darkest Days. It was released on January 13, 2012, as the lead single from the band's second studio album, Sick and Twisted Affair. The song features John 5 on guitar.

Information
There are two different versions of the music video for this song. In one version, the girls are undressed; in the alternate version, they are censored. The video features pornographic actors Ron Jeremy and Sabrina Maree.

Trivia
The band revealed in an interview that the excessive nudity and promiscuity of the shoot caused tension between them and their respective significant others.  Matt Walst's girlfriend left him, while both Brendan McMillan and Doug Oliver dealt with turbulence in their romantic relationships. In another interview, Reid Henry admitted to fraternizing with a young lady in the video, who remained unnamed. Later photos and tweets revealed the model involved to be Penthouse Pet and Hustler model Sabrina Maree.

Charts

References

2011 songs
2012 singles
604 Records singles
Song recordings produced by Joey Moi
Songs about casual sex
Songs written by Joey Moi
Songs written by Ted Bruner
My Darkest Days songs